Zoran Krstanovic (born July 18, 1982) is a Serbian professional basketball player for Joker Sombor. Standing at 6 ft 9 in (2.06 m), he usually plays as power forward or center. He spent most of his career in Romania with U BT Cluj-Napoca, as he played 5 seasons for the team from Cluj-Napoca.

Professional career
In 2013–14 he played for Oberwart Gunners in the Austrian ÖBL. With 20.6 points per game he was the leading scorer in Austria, he was also the fourth-best rebounder with 7.7 a game.

For the 2014–15 season, Krstanovic signed in Romania with SCM CSU Craiova. In January 2015, he was released by Craiova. On January 7, 2015, Krstanovic signed in Hungary with Falco KC Szombathely.

Personal
Zoran is married and have two kids.

References

External links
Profile – RealGM.com

1982 births
Living people
Centers (basketball)
CS Universitatea Cluj-Napoca (men's basketball) players
Donar (basketball club) players
Falco KC Szombathely players
KK Novi Sad players
KK Spartak Subotica players
KK Joker players
Power forwards (basketball)
SAM Basket players
SCM U Craiova (basketball) players
Serbian expatriate basketball people in Austria
Serbian expatriate basketball people in Hungary
Serbian expatriate basketball people in Romania
Serbian expatriate basketball people in Switzerland
Serbian expatriate basketball people in Ukraine
Serbian men's basketball players
Soproni KC players
Sportspeople from Sombor
Union Neuchâtel Basket players